Sar Bisheh (also Romanized as Sar Bīsheh and Sarbīsheh) is a village in Zaz-e Sharqi Rural District, Zaz va Mahru District, Aligudarz County, Lorestan Province, Iran. At the 2006 census, its population was 99, in 15 families.

References 

Towns and villages in Aligudarz County